Sorley is an English surname.

People with the surname
Alexander Clark Sorley (b. 1956), Scottish music producer
Charles Sorley, (1895–1915), a British poet of World War I
Edward Sorley (1871–1933), British actor
Lewis Sorley, (born 1934), an American intelligence analyst and military historian.
Ralph Sorley, (1898–1974), British World War I and World War II Air Force officer
Tom Sorley, a University of Nebraska quarterback
William Ritchie Sorley, (1855–1935), a British philosopher. 

English-language surnames